The Bayard family has been a prominent family of lawyers and politicians throughout American history, primarily from Wilmington, Delaware. Beginning as Federalists, they joined the party of Andrew Jackson and remained leaders of the Democratic Party into the 20th century. Counting Richard Bassett, the father-in-law of James A. Bayard, Sr., the family provided six generations of U.S. senators from Delaware, serving from 1789 until 1929.

History
Ann Stuyvesant Bayard, widowed wife of the French Huguenot Samuel Bayard, came to New Netherland with her brother, Director-General Peter Stuyvesant in 1647. Her grandson, another Samuel Bayard, went to Bohemia Manor, Maryland in 1698. His grandson was John Bubenheim Bayard (1738–1808), Continental Congressman from Pennsylvania, and his great-grandson, John Bayard's nephew, was James A. Bayard, Sr., the first Bayard in the U.S. Senate.

Family members

 Judith Bayard (c. 1615–1687), m. Peter Stuyvesant, Director-General of New Netherland
 Samuel Bayard (c. 1615–c. 1647), m. 1638, Anna Stuyvesant, sister of Peter Stuyvesant; to New Amsterdam 1647
 Nicholas Bayard (c. 1644–1707), m. Judith Varleth, 16th Mayor of New York City, nephew of Peter Stuyvesant
 Samuel Bayard (1669–1746), m. Margaretta Van Cortlandt (1674–1719), a Judge
 Stephen Bayard (1700–1757), m. Alida Vetch (b. 1705), the 39th Mayor of New York City
 William Bayard (1729–1804), m. Catharine McEvers (1732–1814), delegate to the 1765 Stamp Act Congress and loyalist in the Revolutionary War
 Col. John Bubenheim Bayard (1738–1808), Continental Congressman from Pennsylvania, to Philadelphia 1755, m. Margaret Hodge, daughter of Andrew Hodge and Margaret McCulloch
 Samuel Bayard (1757-1832)
 Mary Bayard (1760–1806), m. 1788, William Houstoun (c. 1755–1813), delegate to the Continental Congress and the United States Constitutional Convention and whose name was given to Houston Street in Manhattan
 William Bayard Jr. (1761–1826), m. Elizabeth Cornell (d. 1854), New York City banker, friend to Alexander Hamilton
 Samuel Bayard (1767–1840), lawyer and judge
 James A. Bayard, Sr. (1767–1815), U.S. Senator from Delaware, m. Ann Bassett, daughter of Richard Bassett, U.S. Senator
 Jane Bayard (1772–1851), m. Andrew Kirkpatrick (1756–1831), Chief Justice of the New Jersey Supreme Court
 Margaret Bayard (1778–1844), m. Samuel Harrison Smith
 Richard Henry Bayard (1796–1868), U.S. Senator from Delaware, 1st Mayor of Wilmington, Delaware 
 James Asheton Bayard, Jr. (1799–1880), U.S. Senator from Delaware
 Edward Bayard (1806–1889), m. Tryphena Cady (1804–1891), daughter of Judge Daniel Cady and sister of Elizabeth Cady Stanton. (Edward Bayard attended Union College in Schenectady, New York and studied law under his father-in-law, Daniel Cady.)
 Caroline Smith Bayard (1807–1891), m. Albert Baldwin Dod (1805–1845), professor of mathematics at Princeton University
 Thomas Francis Bayard, Sr. (1828–1898), U.S. Senator from Delaware
 Martha Bayard Dod (1831–1899), m. Edwin Augustus Stevens (1795–1868), founder of Stevens Institute of Technology
 Mabel Bayard Warren (1861–1920), married Boston attorney Samuel D. Warren
 Florence Bayard Hilles (1865–1954), Delaware suffragist
 Thomas Francis Bayard, Jr. (1868–1942), U.S. Senator from Delaware, m. Elizabeth Bradford du Pont, daughter of Alexis I. du Pont
 Alexis Irenee du Pont "Lex" Bayard (1918–1985), Lieutenant Governor of Delaware

References

Bayard Genealogy. Samuel Bayard Genealogy.

External links
Pickett, Russell S. Delaware and U.S. History.
Kestenbaum, Lawrence.  The Political Graveyard.

 
Bayard
Bayard